Brentwood Bay is a small village in the municipality of Central Saanich, on the Saanich Peninsula in British Columbia, Canada. It lies north of the city of Victoria, east of the community of Willis Point, and south of the town of Sidney. Situated on the Saanich Inlet and the Tod Inlet, it includes the Butchart Gardens, the Victoria Butterfly Gardens and the Brentwood Bay Lodge & Spa. Brentwood Bay also includes a BC Ferries dock which connects to Mill Bay. The region also plays host to various wineries and restaurants, and also features hiking and a variety of wildlife in Gowlland Tod Provincial Park.

Brentwood Bay is part of the Central Saanich Municipality (pop. 15,348 (2001)), one of 13 that make up the Greater Victoria area (pop. 344,615 ). It is located on Highway 17A just west of Highway 17 (known locally as the "Pat Bay Highway"), the main route running the length of the Saanich Peninsula. It is also served frequently by the Brentwood-Mill Bay ferry, the MV Klitsa, run by BC Ferries.

Originally named Sluggett after an early settler, it was renamed Brentwood Bay for the town of Brentwood, Essex.

In film 

Black Point starring David Caruso in 2001
The Mermaid Chair starring  Kim Basinger in 2004
Gracepoint television series in 2014 - Remake of UK Broadchurch 2013
 Maid - 2021

External links

Brentwood Bay on BritishColumbia.com

References

Populated places in the Capital Regional District
Saanich Peninsula